State Route 180 (SR 180) is a primary state highway in the U.S. state of Virginia. The state highway runs  from a dead end in Harborton east to SR 1701 in Wachapreague. SR 180 is a cross-peninsula highway in southern Accomack County that passes through Pungoteague and Keller, the latter location where the highway meets U.S. Route 13 (US 13).

Route description

SR 180 begins at a boat ramp on Pungoteague Creek, which flows into the Chesapeake Bay. The state highway follows the shoreline as two-lane undivided Shore Drive, then turns south onto Harborton Road, the main street of the village of Harborton. SR 180 veers southeast to the village of Pungoteague, within which the highway has a very short concurrency with SR 178 (Bobtown Road). The state highway continues southeast and then east as Pungoteague Road to the town of Keller. SR 180 follows 1st Street to US 13 (Lankford Highway), then heads north along the U.S. Highway to the northern town limit of Keller. The state highway has a grade crossing of an inactive railroad line immediately to the east of US 13, then heads east as Wachapreague Road. SR 180 follows Main Street through the town of Wachapreague to its eastern terminus at SR 1701 (Atlantic Avenue) on the waterfront of a channel within the wetlands on the Atlantic Ocean side of the peninsula. Within Wachapreague, SR 180 has a wye route, SR 180Y, that runs  from SR 180 along Brooklyn Street and Richardson Avenue to its terminus at the intersection of Richardson Avenue and Church Street.

Major intersections

References

External links

Virginia Highways Project: VA 180

180
State Route 180